Ostrinia zealis is a moth in the family Crambidae. It was described by Achille Guenée in 1854. It is found in the Russian Far East, Japan, China and India.

Subspecies
Ostrinia zealis zealis (India)
Ostrinia zealis bipatrialis Mutuura & Munroe, 1970 (Japan: Kyushu)
Ostrinia zealis centralis Mutuura & Munroe, 1970 (Japan: Honshu)
Ostrinia zealis holoxuthalis Hampson, 1913 (China: Hubei)
Ostrinia zealis varialis (Bremer, 1864) (Russia: Ussuri)

References

Moths described in 1854
Pyraustinae